ITS Dental Hospital is an Indian hospital and research center located in Greater Noida, Uttar Pradesh, India. It is the part of ITS Education Group which was established in 1996 by Dr. R.P. Chadha.

History
ITS Dental Hospital Greater Noida was established in 2006 by Durga Charitable Trust. It is part of the ITS group was founded in 1996 by Dr. R.P. Chadha. The group provides teaching and learning practices in the areas of Dental, Engineering, Management, and Pharmacy Education. ITS Dental has its other branches in Murad Nagar, Ghaziabad.

Awards
Guinness World Records 2018, most people using mouthwash is 4,097.

Social initiatives
ITS Dental Hospital has undertaken a "Go Green" initiative. Its main focus is on the reduction of carbon footprints, solid waste management, alternative energy resources, etc. 
Dr. R P Chadha, Chairman of ITS Education group contributed for "PM Cares Fund" and “CM Covid Funds” and the cheque has been handed over to Hon'ble General V. K. Singh, Minister of State for Road Transport and Highways, Government of India.   since 1995, ITS - The Education Group has been contributing to the help in natural disasters such as 2001 Gujarat earthquake, Tragedy of Kedarnath, Kargil War, and others. In 2020, the hospital provided 250 beds for corona virus disease patients.

References

 Hospitals in Uttar Pradesh
 Hospitals established in 2006
Dental organisations based in India
Noida
2006 establishments in Andhra Pradesh